Beyondless is the fourth studio album by Danish punk rock band Iceage. The album was released through Matador on 4 May 2018.

Background 
The first single for Beyondless, "Catch It", was released on 12 February 2018. The single was given the Best New Track acclaim from Pitchfork. Sasha Geffen praised the song for its complexity and unpredictability, saying that when it "slows to a false ending and then spins back up into a raucous, unhinged instrumental climax, it only makes his come-on sound like it could double as a threat." With the release of the single, the band announced tour dates for the Summer of 2018.

On 1 March 2018, Iceage released their second single, "Pain Killer" which featured backing vocals from Sky Ferreira. With the release of the single, Iceage announced further details on their fourth studio album, including the full track list, and the name of the album. The track has been described as a jazz-influenced track due to its backing horns and percussion. In an endearing review, Evan Rytlewski of Pitchfork described the track as morose, and praised Ferreira's backing vocals.

Three weeks later, their third single "Take It All" was released. The track was described by Laurence Day of The Line of Best Fit as "sprawling". Ryan Leas of Stereogum gave the track a rave review, claiming it to be the best single of the album. Leas called "Take It All" an "enigmatic piece, with an atmosphere that unfolds gradually and changes within a single moment, managing to come across as haunting, angered, and a darkly pretty reverie simultaneously." In a positive review, Ben Kaye of the Consequence of Sound called the track "lush" and that the brooding singing of Elias Bender Rønnenfelt and the proceeding percussion made the track unique. Ryan Reed of the Rolling Stone gave high remarks to the violin appearance by Nils Gröndahl. Robin Murray of Clash magazine praised the lyricism of the track.

The fourth single released prior to the album releasing was "The Day the Music Dies", which was released on 18 April 2018. Lauren O'Neill of Noisey and subsidiary of Vice magazine, described the track as "driving, rhythmic, and direct". O'Neill also felt that Elias Rønnenfelt's lyricism was "poetic" and "on prime form". Lizzie Manno of Paste magazine felt the track was anxious and restless.

Critical reception 

Beyondless received critical acclaim upon its release. At Metacritic, which assigns a normalized rating out of 100 to reviews from mainstream publications, the album received an average score of 83, based on 24 reviews, indicating "universal acclaim".

Track listing

Personnel 
Credits adapted from AllMusic.

 Nis Bysted – engineer, producer
 Randall Dunn – mixing
 Axel Encke – booklet
 Sille Bræmer Enke – marbles
 Sky Ferreira – vocals
 Christian Friedländer	– band photo
 Mattias Glavå – engineer
 Lars Greve – saxophone
 Nils Gröndahl – violin
 Iceage – design, vocals, composer, producer
 Morten Jessen – trombone
 Tom Larsson – assistant engineer
 Dan Kjaer Nielsen – composer
 Jakob Tvilling Pless – composer
 Jens Ramon – engineer
 Elias Bender Rønnenfelt – composer
 Inger Ronnenfelt – photography
 Nis Sigurdsson – design
 Kasper Tranberg – trumpet
 Johan Suurballe Wieth – composer

Charts

Accolades

References 

2018 albums
Iceage albums
Matador Records albums